Ariel 1 (also known as UK-1 and S-55), was the first British-American satellite, and the first satellite in the Ariel programme. Its launch in 1962 made the United Kingdom the third country to operate a satellite, after the Soviet Union and the United States. It was constructed in the UK and the United States by NASA Goddard Space Flight Center and SERC, under an agreement reached as the result of political discussions in 1959 and 1960. The US Starfish Prime exoatmospheric nuclear test affected Ariel 1's operational capability.

Development 
In late 1959, the British National Committee for Space Research proposed the development of Ariel 1 to NASA. By early the following year the two countries had decided upon terms for the Ariel programme's scope and which organisations would be responsible for which parts of the programme.

The UK Minister of Science named the satellite after the sprite in Shakespeare's The Tempest.

Three units were constructed: one for prototyping, a flight unit, and a backup.

Design

Operation
Solar panels generated power which was stored in nickel-cadmium batteries. A 100-minute tape recorder was used for data collection.

Sensors
SERC provided the experiments, conducted operations, and later analysed and interpreted the results. Six experiments were carried aboard the satellite. Five of these examined the relationship between two types of solar radiation and changes in the Earth's ionosphere. They were selected to leverage techniques developed in the Skylark programme.

Mission

Launch

Ariel 1 was planned to launch on the Scout rocket, but the rocket fell behind in development. The decision was made to launch the satellite on the more expensive Thor-Delta rocket, although the Americans footed the bill.

Ariel 1, the first satellite from a nation besides the United States or the Soviet Union, was launched aboard an American Thor-Delta rocket from Launch Complex 17A at the Cape Canaveral Air Force Station, at 18:00:00 GMT on 26 April 1962. The successful orbit made Ariel 1 the first international satellite.

Operations
Ariel 1 was among several satellites inadvertently damaged or destroyed by the Starfish Prime high-altitude nuclear test on July 9, 1962, and subsequent radiation belt. Its solar panels sustained damage from the irradiation, affecting Ariel 1's operations. The satellite operated even after the nuclear test. The radiation disabled the timer that would have deactivated the satellite after one year, effectively extending the satellite's life. It decayed from orbit on 24 May 1976.

Results
The experiments provided X-ray energy data from over 20 solar flares.

Notes

References

External links
 
The Cold War nuke that fried satellites (BBC)
The Ariel 1 Satellite
First International Satellite
Electronic Integration of the UK-1 International Ionsphere Satellite
Special issue: 50 years of the UK in space
THE ROYAL SOCIETY’S FORMATIVE ROLE IN UK SPACE RESEARCH
The Ariel 1 Satellite

Spacecraft launched in 1962
United Kingdom–United States relations
Satellites formerly orbiting Earth
First artificial satellites of a country
Satellites of the United Kingdom